Mid-Wales Constabulary was the Home Office police force for the counties of Brecknockshire, Radnorshire and Montgomeryshire, Wales, between 1948 and 1968. 

The force was created on 1 April 1948 by the amalgamation of Brecknockshire Constabulary, Radnorshire Constabulary and Montgomeryshire Constabulary under sections 3 and 4 of the Police Act 1946. The Headquarters were in Newtown. The force was abolished in 1968, when it was amalgamated with Carmarthenshire and Cardiganshire Constabulary and Pembrokeshire Constabulary to form Dyfed-Powys Police.

In 1965, the force had an establishment of 225 officers and an actual strength of 220.

Footnotes

External links
Home Office Circular 71-1948 announcing the force's creation
 Home Office Circular 98-1968 announcing the force's abolition

Defunct police forces of Wales
History of Brecknockshire
Radnorshire
History of Montgomeryshire
History of Powys
Government agencies established in 1948
1948 establishments in the United Kingdom
1968 disestablishments in Wales
Government agencies disestablished in 1968